Stranorlar is a town, townland and civil parish in the Finn Valley of County Donegal, in Ireland. Stranorlar and Ballybofey (located on the other side of the River Finn) form the Twin Towns.

Transport
The town is located at the junction of the N15 and N13 national primary roads. For nearly 100 years, Stranorlar was the headquarters of the County Donegal Railway system (originally the Finn Valley Railway), with services to Derry and Letterkenny via Strabane (near Lifford), to Ballyshannon and Killybegs via Donegal, and to Glenties. At its peak, the railway had 130 employees. The last train ran from Stranorlar in 1960.

Stranorlar railway station was built by the Finn Valley Railway and opened on 7 September 1863 and finally closed on 6 February 1960. The old railway station was demolished to make way for a new bus garage owned and run by Bus Éireann. To celebrate the millennium, the old clock from the railway station was restored and installed in a new clock tower which sits at the old pedestrian entrance to the railway station yard. The town remains the main depot for Bus Éireann within County Donegal.

The nearest railway station is operated by Northern Ireland Railways and runs from Londonderry railway station via Coleraine to Belfast Central Station and Belfast Great Victoria Street railway station. The strategically important Belfast-Derry railway line is to be upgraded to facilitate more frequent trains and improvements to the permanent way such as track and signalling to enable faster services.

The next nearest railway station is Sligo railway station where Iarnród Éireann, trains run to Dublin Connolly. The town is served by the No. 64 Bus Eireann service between Derry and Galway which connects the town to Donegal Town, Ballyshannon, Bundoran, Sligo and Letterkenny. There is also a regular service to Lifford and Strabane.

Education
Stranorlar is home to St. Columba's College and Finn Valley College. The town is also home to three primary schools. St Mary's primary school, Robertson National School and the Sessiaghoneil school.

Religion

Isaac Butt MP, founder of the Home Rule Movement is buried in the churchyard of the Church of Ireland (C of I Church) which is a registered monument. The Catholic Church of St Mary is an imposing 19th Century structure. There is a Reformed Presbyterian Church of Ireland and a Presbyterian Church of Ireland church in Stranorlar also.

Sport
 Finn Valley Athletics Club has its track in the town. 
 There is an 18-hole golf course and game fishing in the River Finn, and nearby is the Lough Alann bird sanctuary.
 Stranorlar is home to Finn Valley Rugby Club

Tourism
Drumboe Woods are the major attraction of Stranorlar. The woods are managed by Coillte and provide walking routes along the banks of the River Finn and the upper woods. Outside the town, a small folly called The Steeple is a popular destination for many walkers. From the top of the tower, on a clear day, the hillfort of The Grianan of Aileach can be seen. There is a raised ring fort at Dunwiley, outside the town. There are numerous guest houses throughout the town and on the main street is Stranorlar's only hotel. Kee's Hotel is a family-run hotel, first established in the 19th century as a coach house. The vernacular architecture of the town is largely 19th-century solid two and three-storey townhouses, one or two of some interest. Unfortunately, they are rapidly being lost to development.

Notable people
Peter Benson, builder and architect, who laid out the new town of Stranrolar 
 Frances Browne, poet and novelist
 James Boyle, MP
 Helen O'Clery, writer
 Jason Quigley, boxer

See also
List of towns and villages in Ireland
Stranorlar County Mother & Baby Home

References

External links

Towns and villages in County Donegal
Townlands of County Donegal
Civil parishes of County Donegal
Twin cities